Katherine Whitton Baker (born June 8, 1950) is an American actress. Baker began her career in theater and made her screen debut in the 1983 drama film The Right Stuff. She received the National Society of Film Critics Award for Best Supporting Actress and an Independent Spirit Award nomination for her performance in Street Smart (1987). Baker also has appeared in over 50 films, including  Jacknife (1989), Edward Scissorhands (1990), The Cider House Rules (1999), Cold Mountain (2003), Nine Lives (2005), The Jane Austen Book Club (2007), Last Chance Harvey (2008), Take Shelter (2011), Saving Mr. Banks (2013), and The Age of Adaline (2015).

On television, Baker starred as Dr. Jill Brock in the CBS drama series Picket Fences (1992–1996), for which she received three Primetime Emmy Award for Outstanding Lead Actress in a Drama Series and Golden Globe and Screen Actors Guild Awards. She later received three additional nominations and a Primetime Emmy Award for her performances in Touched by an Angel, Boston Public, and Door to Door.

Early life
Baker was born in Midland, Texas, and raised a Quaker. She attended high school at Mills High School in Millbrae, California. She graduated in 1968. Her drama instructor, Allen Knight, was a major influence in her desire to become a professional actress. She attended the Boston University School of Fine Arts Acting program and studied acting at the California Institute of the Arts in the early 1970s. She later earned a B.A. degree in French in 1977 from UC Berkeley.

Career
Baker began her acting career at San Francisco's Magic Theatre, performing in several of Sam Shepard's plays before getting her break in an off-Broadway production of Fool for Love (1983) opposite Ed Harris. She won an Obie Award for this role. In the same year she was cast as Louise Shepard, Alan Shepard's wife, in the drama film The Right Stuff. She later had dramatic performances as a prostitute in Street Smart (1987) and a recovering alcoholic and victim of domestic abuse in Clean and Sober (1988). For her performance in Street Smart, Baker has won National Society of Film Critics Award for Best Supporting Actress and Boston Society of Film Critics Award for Best Supporting Actress as well as an Independent Spirit Award for Best Supporting Female nomination. She later starred in films Dad, Jacknife and Edward Scissorhands.

From 1992 to 1996, Baker starred as Jill Brock, a small-town doctor, in the CBS critically acclaimed drama series Picket Fences created by David E. Kelley. For her performance in the series she won the Primetime Emmy Award for Outstanding Lead Actress in a Drama Series three times: in 1993, 1995 and 1996, Golden Globe Award for Best Actress – Television Series Drama in 1994, and Screen Actors Guild Award for Outstanding Performance by a Female Actor in a Drama Series in 1995. She later appeared in David E. Kelley's dramas Ally McBeal, The Practice and had the recurring role as Meredith Peters in Boston Public, for which she was nominated for a Primetime Emmy Award for Outstanding Guest Actress in a Drama Series in 2001. Baker also received Emmy Award nominations for her guest performance in Touched by an Angel and in the category Outstanding Supporting Actress in a Miniseries or a Movie for Door to Door.

Baker has appeared in over 50 theatrical films in supporting and leading roles. She starred in two movies directed by Rodrigo García: Things You Can Tell Just by Looking at Her (2000) and Nine Lives (2005). Her other major credits include The Cider House Rules (1999), Cold Mountain (2003), 13 Going on 30 (2004), The Jane Austen Book Club (2007), Last Chance Harvey (2008), Take Shelter (2011) and Saving Mr. Banks (2013). She starred opposite Tom Selleck in the Jesse Stone made-for-TV film series in the 2000s. Also on television she guest-starred on Nip/Tuck, Law & Order: Special Victims Unit, Grey's Anatomy, and Medium. She also starred in the short-lived Lifetime drama series Against the Wall in 2011.

Baker also appears in the Netflix series The Ranch along with Ashton Kutcher and Elisha Cuthbert.

Personal life
She lives in Southern California with her second husband, director/producer Steven Robman, whom she married in 2003. She has a son and daughter with her first husband, Donald Camillieri.

Filmography

Film

Television

Awards and nominations

References

External links
 
 
 Kathy Baker 2003 Interview on Sidewalks Entertainment

1950 births
Living people
American film actresses
American stage actresses
American television actresses
Best Drama Actress Golden Globe (television) winners
Outstanding Performance by a Lead Actress in a Drama Series Primetime Emmy Award winners
Outstanding Performance by a Female Actor in a Drama Series Screen Actors Guild Award winners
American people of English descent
American people of French descent
People from Midland, Texas
Actresses from Texas
Actresses from New Mexico
UC Berkeley College of Letters and Science alumni
20th-century American actresses
21st-century American actresses